Gayoso is an unincorporated community in Pemiscot County, in the U.S. state of Missouri.

History
A post office called Gayoso was established in 1854, and remained in operation until 1900. The community was named after Don Miguel Gayoso de Lamos, a Spanish colonial politician.

References

Unincorporated communities in Pemiscot County, Missouri
Unincorporated communities in Missouri